Sarasota Square Mall, formerly Westfield Shoppingtown Sarasota Square and Westfield Sarasota Square, is a shopping mall in Sarasota, Florida.  Its anchors are Costco, JCPenney, and AMC Sarasota 12.

History
Arlen Realty and Development Corporation, a predecessor of CBL & Associates Properties, announced Sarasota Square Mall in 1976.  The mall was planned to be anchored by Maas Brothers and JCPenney, the latter of which would relocate from nearby Southgate Shopping Plaza (which was an outdoor strip mall at the time).  The mall would also include J. Byrons as a smaller anchor as well as a six-screen movie theater. Additional space was left on the north side for an additional large anchor.  Maas Brothers, J. Byrons, and the movie theater opened August 4, 1977.  Sarasota Square officially held its grand opening on September 28, 1977, and JCPenney opened the same day. JCPenney was located on the south side of the mall, and Maas Brothers and J. Byrons located across from each other in the center.  The movie theater was located within the mall on the northeast corner.  A second six-screen theater opened in 1978 in a separate building on the northeast corner of the mall property, giving the mall a total of 12 screens.  Other early tenants in the mall included Camelot Music, Kinney Shoes, and Morrison's Cafeteria.

Sears built a store at Sarasota Square on the additional anchor space on the north side, which opened on October 24, 1979.

J. Byrons closed in 1985, and its space was converted into the Trellis Garden Food Court which opened in March of 1986.  An expansion from the food court east began construction in 1986 which included a fourth anchor, Parisian, which was the store's second location outside its home state of Alabama.  Parisian opened on November 1, 1989.

In 1991, Maas Brothers was merged with Burdines by the parent company of the two stores.  Despite the fact that Burdines operated a store nearby at Southgate, the company retained its store at Sarasota Square.  The Maas Brothers store was officially rebranded as Burdines on October 20, 1991.  Along with the rest of the Burdines chain, the Sarasota Square store was renamed Burdines-Macy's on January 30, 2004 as the brands were merged by their parent company.  On March 6, 2005, the Burdines name was officially dropped and the stores were fully merged into Macy's.

In 1995, it was reported that Parisian had planned to sell its store to Dillard's. According to the plan, if Dillard's failed to acquire the Parisian store, it would instead build its own store adjacent to JCPenney, and the Parisian site would be sold to Jacobson's. Ultimately, Parisian closed in January of 1996, and Dillard's opened in the former Parisian building on March 2, 1996.

Westfield
Westfield Group acquired the mall in 2003 from then-owners Coyote Group, and renamed it Westfield Shoppingtown Sarasota Square. The "Shoppingtown" was dropped in June 2005. 

In 2006, Westfield refurbished both the interior and exterior of the mall.  A new 12-screen AMC theater was built between Dillard's and JCPenney along with a new adjoining food court.  The theater opened on December 20, 2006. The two previous six-screen theaters were closed and the previous Trellis Garden Food Court was remodeled into more store space.

Dillard's closed its Westfield Sarasota Square store, along with a nearby store at DeSoto Square in Bradenton on December 5, 2009. The Sarasota Square store was demolished and replaced with a Costco, which opened on August 17, 2012.

In 2015, Sears Holdings spun off 235 of its properties, including the Sears at Westfield Sarasota Square, into Seritage Growth Properties. 

In 2017, Macy's and Sears announced their stores at Sarasota Square would close.  Macy's closure was part of a plan to close 68 stores nationwide, with Sarasota Square's store closing permanently on March 26, 2017.  Sears closure was part of a plan to close 20 additional stores nationwide after announcing 72 closures on June 6, 2017. Sears closed permanently on September 18, 2017.

On July 31, 2020, JCPenney put 21 stores up for sale, including the JCPenney at Sarasota Square. As of 2023, JCPenney is still operating.

Current
In July 2019, Unibail-Rodamco-Westfield announced the shopping center would be renamed "Sarasota Square", dropping Westfield from its name and returning it to its original name before Westfield Group's acquisition of the property. In August 2020, the mall's noteholder, U.S. Bank National Association, notified Unibail-Rodamco-Westfield of proceeding with foreclosure action. Unibail-Rodamco-Westfield was notified on May 5, 2020 of its default to the mortgage-backed security loan associated with the property.

The Florida Department of Health (FDOH) utilized the mall as a county-operated COVID-19 vaccination clinic from January to June 2021. The Department of Health in Sarasota County stated they delivered more than 150,000 doses of the Moderna vaccine at the vaccination clinic.

References

Shopping malls in Florida
Buildings and structures in Sarasota, Florida
Tourist attractions in Sarasota County, Florida
Shopping malls established in 1977